Tabanus sulcifrons is a species of horse fly in the family Tabanidae.

Subspecies
These two subspecies belong to the species Tabanus sulcifrons:
 Tabanus sulcifrons sulcifrons Macquart, 1855
 Tabanus sulcifrons variegatus Fabricius, 1805

References

Tabanidae
Insects described in 1855
Diptera of North America
Taxa named by Pierre-Justin-Marie Macquart